Time to Let Go may refer to:

"Time to Let Go", a song by Eddy Grant from Can't Get Enough
"Time to Let Go", a novel by Lurlene McDaniel